The miR-135 microRNA precursor is a small non-coding RNA that is involved in regulating gene expression.  It has been shown to be expressed in human, mouse and rat.  miR-135 has now been predicted or experimentally confirmed in a wide range of vertebrate species (MIPF0000028). Precursor microRNAs are ~70 nucleotides in length and are processed by the Dicer enzyme to produce the shorter 21-24 nucleotide mature sequence.   In this case the mature sequence is excised from the 5' arm of the hairpin.

Targets of miR-135

 Nagel et al.. showed that miR-135a and b target the 3' untranslated region of the APC gene.

References

External links
 
 MIPF0000028

MicroRNA
MicroRNA precursor families